Count on You may refer to:

 "Count on You", a 2010 song by Big Time Rush from BTR
 "Count on You", a 1985 song by Tommy Shaw from What If